Brachylaima cribbi is a species of terrestrial trematode parasites in the family Brachylaimidae.

Overview

Intermediate hosts for Brachylaima cribbi are terrestrial snails Cochlicella acuta, Cernuella virgata and Theba pisana.

Named after Thomas Cribb, helminthologist at UQ.

References

External links
  Brachylaima cribbi at Adelaide Thesis Library

Plagiorchiida
Parasites of molluscs